Popperfoto is one of the largest and oldest image archives in Europe, owned by Paul Popper Ltd. It is licensed and marketed through Getty Images.

History 
Popperfoto was founded in 1934 by the Jewish photojournalist , who came from the Czech Republic and emigrated from Berlin to London. The archive contains more than 12 million monochrome photographs and more than 750,000 color photos spanning 150 years. The content of the collection ranges from documentation of historical events to photographs of personalities from politics, sports and entertainment to collections of various topics. Some of the most important images in the collection include the original negatives from Herbert Ponting's photographic record of Antarctic explorer Robert Falcon Scott's 1910–1912 Antarctic voyage, as well as color photographs of the front lines in various areas of World War II.

Paul Popper Limited is the rightsholder of the Popperfoto collection. Photographer Robert John Thomas is the current director of the business, based in Great Brington, Northampton, England.

License acquisition by Getty Images 

In 2006, the media licensor Getty Images negotiated marketing and licensing control of the collection, it has administered the collection since 2007.

References

External links 

 The Popperfoto collection on Getty Images

Photo archives